Double X: The Name of the Game is a 1992 British thriller film. The screenplay by Shani S. Grewal is based in part on Vengeance, a novel by David Fleming.

The film features Norman Wisdom, William Katt, Gemma Craven, Simon Ward, Bernard Hill, & Chloë Annett

Synopsis
Expert safecracker Arthur Clutten (Wisdom) masterminds heists for a criminal syndicate he belongs to. But after witnessing the brutal methods of persuasion being meted out by gang leader, Ignatius Smith (Hill), Clutten decides to quit. But he realises the gang would sooner see him killed than quitting. After stealing some documents incriminating Smith and his boss, Edward Ross (Ward), Clutten then puts his family in hiding and goes on the run...but his daughter (Annett) has been kidnapped by the gang and a hitman (Katt) has been hired and is close to finding Clutten.

Cast
Norman Wisdom as Arthur Clutten
William Katt as Michael Cooper
Gemma Craven as Jenny Eskridge
Simon Ward as Edward Ross
Bernard Hill as Ignatious 'Iggy' Smith
Chloë Annett as Sarah Clutten
Leon Herbert as Ollie
Derren Nesbitt as The Minister
Vladek Sheybal as Pawnbroker

Cast notes
First film role for Norman Wisdom in 20 years.
Chloë Annett makes her feature film début.
Last film of Vladek Sheybal.

Locations
Filmed in the UK at the following locations:

Monkey Island, Bray, Berkshire, England

Portpatrick, Dumfries and Galloway, Scotland

Stranraer, Dumfries and Galloway, Scotland

DVD release
The DVD was released onto Region 2 DVD on 25 February 2007 in the UK under "The BEST of BRITISH Collection" tag by Odeon Entertainment.

References

External links
Double X: The Name of the Game at The Internet Movie Database
Double X: The Name of the Game - Filming Locations
Double X: The Name Of The Game: Permanent Plastic Helmet - Films That You Probably Haven't Seen and Definitely Shouldn't
 

1992 films
1992 crime thriller films
British crime thriller films
Films about child abduction
Films based on organized crime novels
1990s English-language films
1990s British films